Wętfie may refer to the following places in Poland:

Wętfie, Kuyavian-Pomeranian Voivodeship
Wętfie, Pomeranian Voivodeship